The Interstate Highways in Oregon are the segments of the national Dwight D. Eisenhower System of Interstate and Defense Highways that are owned and maintained by the U.S. state of Oregon. On a national level, the standards and numbering for the system are handled by the Federal Highway Administration (FHWA) and the American Association of State Highway and Transportation Officials (AASHTO), while the highways in Oregon are maintained by the Oregon Department of Transportation (ODOT).

These highways are built to Interstate Highway standards, meaning they are all freeways with minimum requirements for full control of access, design speeds of  depending on type of terrain, a minimum of two travel lanes in each direction, and specific widths of lanes or shoulders; exceptions from these standards have to be approved by the FHWA. The numbering scheme used to designate the Interstates was developed by AASHTO, an organization composed of the various state departments of transportation in the United States.

The Oregon state government initially proposed numbering the auxiliary Interstates using lettered suffixes, but were denied in 1958 by the American Association of State Highway Officials (forerunner to the AASHTO). The last section of the Interstate Highway system to be built in Oregon, on I-82 near Hermiston, opened on September 20, 1988.


Primary Interstate Highways

Auxiliary Interstate Highways

References

External links

Oregon Department of Transportation website
Oregon highways at AARoads.com

 
Interstate